The Brothers is an American television sitcom broadcast by CBS during its 1956-57 season.  Reruns of The Brothers were also broadcast by CBS during the summer of 1958 on an alternate-week basis, alternating with repeats of Bachelor Father.

Synopsis
The Brothers (original pilot title: The Box Brothers) was about the small adventures of the Box brothers, Gil and Harvey, who owned a photography studio in San Francisco.  Harvey was the more aggressive, overbearing brother while Gil was a reserved, shy man who happily allowed his big brother to run things.  Both of them had steady girlfriends who were matched to their personalities, Harvey's being the strong-willed, aggressive Dr. Margaret Kleeb and Gil's being the quiet, unassuming Marilee Dorf.

It was one of the first shows to have an unseen character.  Andy, the darkroom person, was always heard but never seen.

Cast

Episodes

References
Brooks, Tim and Marsh, Earle, The Complete Directory to Prime Time Network and Cable TV Shows

External links

CBS original programming
1950s American sitcoms
Television shows set in San Francisco
1956 American television series debuts
1957 American television series endings
Television series about brothers
Television series by CBS Studios
Black-and-white American television shows
English-language television shows